Alessandro Fei may refer to:

Alessandro Fei (painter) (1543–1592), Italian painter
Alessandro Fei (volleyball) (born 1978), Italian volleyball player